Fanar ( translit. al-Fanar) is a village in the Matn District of the Mount Lebanon Governorate, Lebanon. It is situated in the heart of Lebanon, 7 km from Beirut and was previously called (Achrafieh El Fawqa) however the name Fanar was chosen since it had an important lighthouse. The town was known to have very few residents who were farmers and the area was almost entirely green until after the Lebanese civil war when many displaced families chose the area to live in and turned the small town into a city.

Civil war 
During the civil war, 4 young Christian men of the Kataeb Party were assassinated in Fanar by Muslims in the area, which sparked the Black Saturday, a revenge act in which cause the killing of hundreds of Muslim citizens across Lebanon.

Etymology

Fanar is an Arabic word that means a lantern (through Ancient Greek phanòs, φανός).

Geography

Fanar is 8 km away from the capital Beirut lying at an elevation of approximately 250m above sea level.

Demographics

As of 2008, Fanar houses a population of approximately 30 000 of whom 850 are registered voters.

Education

Higher education in Fanar is provided by a large number of schools and universities, such as Lebanese University (Faculty of Science, Faculty of Media and Communication, Faculty of Literatures), Al-Kafaàt University (AKU), College De la Sainte Famille Francaise Fanar, Institution Moderne du Liban (IML), and Collège Notre Dame du Mont Carmel des Sœurs Carmelites de Florence à Fanar. College Stes. Hripsimiantz des soeurs Armeniennes Catholiques de l'Immaculée Conception.

References and footnotes

External links

Populated places in the Matn District
Christian cities in Lebanon